Mangeli or Mangali or Mangili may refer to:
 Mangeli, Bushehr
 Mangeli, Hormozgan
 Mangeli-ye Olya, North Khorasan Province
 Mangeli-ye Sofla, North Khorasan Province